Toomai of the Elephants is a short story by Rudyard Kipling about a young elephant-handler.  It was first published in the December 1893 issue of St. Nicholas magazine and reprinted in the collection of Kipling short stories, The Jungle Book (1894). The character Petersen Sahib is thought to be modelled on India-born English naturalist George P. Sanderson (1848–1892).

The story was filmed in 1937 as Elephant Boy directed by Robert Flaherty and Zoltan Korda, starring Sabu.  The story was also produced in 1973 as the TV series Elephant Boy starring Esrom Jayasinghe.

Plot 
Big Toomai, the boss driver of elephants, takes little pleasure from his work. But his 10-year-old son, Little Toomai, loves the elephants and they understand his kindness. Asking to go on a hunt, his father tells him he can go when he sees the elephants dance, which is something that no man has ever seen an elephant do.

References

Sources
Toomai of the Elephants. London: Macmillan and Co., 1937 ("the photographs illustrating this edition are from the London Film Production «Elephant Boy» ... most of these photographs were taken in India by Mrs. F. H. Flaherty.")

External links 

The story and notes on kipling.org.uk
Toomai of the Elephants — Online eBook format (public domain)

The Jungle Book stories
Short stories by Rudyard Kipling
Works originally published in St. Nicholas Magazine
Male characters in literature
Child characters in literature
Elephants in literature
Literary characters introduced in 1893
Short stories adapted into films
1893 short stories